San Carlos Gutierrez Airport   is a rural airstrip  northeast of El Peru del Apere in the Beni Department of Bolivia.

See also

Transport in Bolivia
List of airports in Bolivia
Talk:San Carlos Gutierrez Airport

References

External links 
OurAirports - San Carlos Gutierrez
Bing Maps - San Carlos Gutierrez
HERE/Nokia - San Carlos Gutierrez

Airports in Beni Department